Ray Longo is a mixed martial arts (MMA) coach, a stunt man and actor. Considered one of the top coaches in MMA, he is the Head coach of the Serra-Longo fight team. He has trained and cornered three UFC Champions, Matt Serra, Chris Weidman and Aljamain Sterling.

Longo graduated from St. John’s University in 1980 and began working full time as an accountant while training a few fighters by night. After meeting Matt Serra, they formed the Serra-Longo fight team.

As a striking coach, Longo takes extra precautions regarding fighter's health, including concussions. He is a certified instructor of Bruce Lee's Jeet Kun Do Concepts.

Longo was a 2015 World MMA Awards Coach of The Year nominee.

References

Living people
Mixed martial arts trainers
Year of birth missing (living people)
St. John's University (New York City) alumni

External links